Guido Petti Pagadizábal (born 17 November 1994) is an Argentine rugby union footballer who plays as a lock or  Flank for Bordeaux Begles and the Argentina national rugby union team.

Career

Guido played with San Isidro Club in the Torneo de la URBA in his homeland. In 2016 he joined the Jaguares, Argentina's Super Rugby team. In 2020 he moved to France to play for Bordeaux Begles in the Top 14.

International career

Petti was a member of the Argentina Under-20 side which competed in the 2013 and 2014 IRB Junior World Championships, he also represented the Argentina Jaguars side in 2013 and 2014 and played for the Pampas XV during their 2014 tour of Oceania.

He was part of the national team that competed at the 2015 Rugby World Cup.

Petti was a starter for the  national team on 14 November 2020 in their first ever win against the All Blacks.

References

1994 births
Living people
Argentine people of Italian descent
Argentine people of Basque descent
Rugby union players from Buenos Aires
Rugby union locks
San Isidro Club rugby union players
Argentine rugby union players
Argentina international rugby union players
Jaguares (Super Rugby) players
Pampas XV players